Alfred Waldron may refer to:

Alfred Waldron (footballer) (1857–1929), Australian rules footballer and cricketer
Alfred M. Waldron (1865–1952), American Republican politician

See also
Alfred Waldron Smithers (1850–1924), British financier and parliamentarian